The Qatar Fund for Development (acronym: QFFD) is a government entity in the State of Qatar, which is responsible for Qatar's international development and foreign aid; it was established by Law 19 of 2002. The QFFD also coordinates Qatar's charitable and development institutions and the Director-General is Khalifa Jassim Al-Kuwari. In May 2017, the QFFD met with UNESCO to discuss the UNESCO Heritage Emergency Fund, which the QFFD helps fund, though other areas of cooperation were also incorporated into the discussion. Qatar has also pledged to help Rohingya refugees in Malaysia using the money from the QFFD. According to the OECD, Qatar provided US$534 million official development assistance in 2020.

References

Organisations based in Qatar
Government-owned companies of Qatar
International development agencies
2002 establishments in Qatar
Organizations established in 2002